George Richard Chamberlain (born March 31, 1934) is an American actor and singer, who became a teen idol in the title role of the television show Dr. Kildare (1961–1966). He subsequently appeared in several miniseries, such as Shōgun (1980) and The Thorn Birds (1983) and was the first to play Jason Bourne in the 1988 television film The Bourne Identity. Chamberlain has also performed classical stage roles and worked in musical theatre.

Early life
Chamberlain was born in 1934 in Beverly Hills, California, the second son of Elsa Winnifred (née von Benzon; later Matthews) and Charles Axion Chamberlain, who was a salesman. In 1952, Chamberlain graduated from Beverly Hills High School and later attended Pomona College (class of 1956). Chamberlain was drafted into the United States Army, attaining the rank of sergeant while serving in Korea from 1956–58.

Career

Chamberlain co-founded a Los Angeles–based theatre group, Company of Angels, and began appearing on television in guest roles in the early 1960s. In 1961, he gained widespread fame as the young intern, Dr. Kildare, in the NBC/MGM television series of the same name, co-starring with Raymond Massey. Chamberlain's singing ability also led to some hit singles in the early 1960s, including the "Theme from Dr. Kildare", titled "Three Stars Will Shine Tonight", which struck No. 10 according to the Billboard Hot 100 Charts. Dr. Kildare ended in 1966, after which Chamberlain began performing on the theatre circuit. In 1966, he was cast opposite Mary Tyler Moore in the ill-fated Broadway musical Breakfast at Tiffany's, co-starring Priscilla Lopez, which, after an out-of-town tryout period, closed after only four previews. Decades later, he returned to Broadway in revivals of My Fair Lady  and The Sound of Music.

At the end of the 1960s, Chamberlain spent a period of time in England, where he played in repertory theatre and in the BBC's Portrait of a Lady adaptation, becoming recognized as a serious actor. In 1969, he starred opposite Katharine Hepburn in the film The Madwoman of Chaillot. While in England, he took vocal coaching and in 1969 performed the title role in Hamlet for the Birmingham Repertory Theatre, becoming the first American to play the role there since John Barrymore in 1925. He received excellent notices and reprised the role for television in 1970 for the Hallmark Hall of Fame. A recording of the presentation was released by RCA Red Seal Records and was nominated for a Grammy Award.

In the 1970s, Chamberlain enjoyed success as a leading man in films: The Music Lovers (1970), Lady Caroline Lamb (playing Lord Byron; 1973), The Three Musketeers (1973), The Lady's Not for Burning (made for television, 1974), The Towering Inferno (in a villainous turn as a dishonest engineer, 1974), and The Count of Monte Cristo (1975). In The Slipper and the Rose (1976), a musical version of the Cinderella story, co-starring Gemma Craven, he displayed his vocal talents. A television film, William Bast's The Man in the Iron Mask (1977), followed. The same year, he starred in Peter Weir's film The Last Wave.

Chamberlain later appeared in several popular television mini-series (earning him a nickname of "King of the Mini-Series"), including Centennial (1978–79), Shōgun (1980), and The Thorn Birds (1983) as Father Ralph de Bricassart with Rachel Ward and Barbara Stanwyck co-starring. In the 1980s, he appeared as leading man with King Solomon's Mines (1985), and played Jason Bourne/David Webb in the television film version of The Bourne Identity (1988).

Since 1990
Since the 1990s, Chamberlain has appeared mainly in television films, on stage, and as a guest star on such series as The Drew Carey Show and Will & Grace. He starred as Henry Higgins in the 1993–1994 Broadway revival of My Fair Lady. In the fall of 2005, Chamberlain appeared in the title role of Ebenezer Scrooge in the Broadway National Tour of Scrooge: The Musical. In 2006, Chamberlain guest-starred in an episode of the British drama series Hustle as well as season 4 of Nip/Tuck. In 2007, Chamberlain guest-starred in episode 80 (Season 4, Episode 8, "Distant Past") of Desperate Housewives as Glen Wingfield, Lynette Scavo's stepfather.

In 2008 and 2009, Chamberlain appeared as King Arthur in the national tour of Monty Python's Spamalot. In 2010, he appeared as Archie Leach in season 3, episode 3 of the series Leverage, as well as two episodes of season 4 of Chuck where he played a villain known only as The Belgian. Chamberlain has also appeared in several episodes of Brothers & Sisters, playing an old friend and love-interest of Saul's. He also appeared in the independent film We Are the Hartmans in 2011. In 2012, Chamberlain appeared on stage in the Pasadena Playhouse as Dr. Sloper in the play The Heiress.

In 2017 Chamberlain appeared in Twin Peaks: The Return as Bill Kennedy.

Personal life

Chamberlain was not open about his homosexuality for most of his career, to protect his privacy and his acting opportunities. He was outed by the French women's magazine Nous Deux in December 1989, but did not confirm it until his 2003 autobiography Shattered Love: A Memoir.

Chamberlain was involved romantically with actor Wesley Eure in the early 1970s.

In 1977, Chamberlain began a long-term relationship with Martin Rabbett, an actor 20 years his junior. Rabbett played the brother of Chamberlain's lead character in the 1986 film Allan Quatermain and the Lost City of Gold. They began living together in Hawaii in 1986 and had a private commitment ceremony. The couple split amicably in 2010, with Chamberlain moving to Los Angeles. In a 2014 interview, Chamberlain said that while he and Rabbett were no longer intimately involved, they remained close friends.

Awards
In 1962, Chamberlain won the Golden Apple Award for Most Co-Operative Actor. In 1963 he won a Golden Globe award for Best TV Star – Male for: Dr. Kildare (1961). He won the Photoplay Award for Most Popular Male Star for three consecutive years, from 1962 to 1964.

Chamberlain was nominated for a Grammy Award for a recording of his Hamlet.

In 1980, he won the Golden Apple award for Male Star of the Year. In 1981, he won a Golden Globe award for Best Performance by an Actor in a TV-Series – Drama for: Shogun (1980). In 1982, he won the Clavell de Plata award at the Sitges – Catalan International Film Festival as Best Actor for The Last Wave (1977). In 1984, he won a Golden Globe award for Best Performance by an Actor in a Mini-Series or Motion Picture Made for TV for: The Thorn Birds (1983). In 1985, he won the Aftonbladet TV Prize (Sweden) for Best Foreign TV Personality – Male.

On March 12, 2011, Chamberlain received the Steiger Award (Germany) for accomplishments in the arts.

Filmography

Film

Television films

Television series

Discography
From Richard Chamberlain Sings: UK #8
 "Theme from Dr. Kildare (Three Stars Will Shine Tonight)" (1962) – US #10; UK #12
 "Love Me Tender" (1962) – US #21; UK #15
 "All I Have to Do Is Dream" (1963) – US #14
 "Hi-Lili, Hi-Lo" (1963) – US #64; UK #20
 "I Will Love You" (1963) – US #65
 "True Love" (1963) – US #98; UK #30

From Twilight of Honor
 "Blue Guitar"/"They Long to Be Close to You" (1963) – US #42

From Richard Chamberlain (aka Joy in the Morning)
 "Joy in the Morning" (1964)
 "Rome Will Never Leave You" (1964) – US #99

From The Slipper and the Rose
"Secret Kingdom" (1976)
"He Danced With Me/She Danced With Me" (1976)
"What a Comforting Thing to Know" (1976)
"Why Can't I Be Two People?" (1976)
"Bride-Finding Ball" (1976)

From Haleakala: How Maui Snared The Sun/Clarinet Concerto
"Haleakala: How Maui Snared The Sun (Tone Poem) (1991), composed by Dan Welcher, performed with the Honolulu Symphony"

Published works

See also

References

External links

 
 
 
 Richard Chamberlain in the glbtq Encyclopaedia
 Richard Chamberlain's art website
 

1934 births
Living people
20th-century American male actors
20th-century American LGBT people
21st-century American male actors
21st-century American LGBT people
American expatriates in England
American male film actors
American male stage actors
American male television actors
American male pop singers
Beverly Hills High School alumni
Best Drama Actor Golden Globe (television) winners
Best Miniseries or Television Movie Actor Golden Globe winners
American gay actors
American gay musicians
American LGBT singers
LGBT people from California
Male actors from Beverly Hills, California
Male actors from Hawaii
Metro-Goldwyn-Mayer contract players
MGM Records artists
Pomona College alumni
United States Army non-commissioned officers
Writers from California